Marumari is an American intelligent dance music band consisting of Josh and Sasha Presseisen, and is based in Albany, New York.

Discography
Story of the Heavens (1999 · Cunsanto Records) 
Ballad of the Round Ball (1999 · Carpark Records)
The Wolves Hollow (2000 · Carpark Records)
Supermogadon (2001 · Carpark Records)
4876 (2001 · Audiobot Records)
The Remixes (2002 · Carpark Records)
Path scrubber EP (2005)
Pegasys (2019 - Self-release)

References

External links
Marumari official website
Carpark Records website

American electronic music groups
Intelligent dance musicians